Elemer Hirsch (14 May 1895 – 17 May 1953) was a Romanian lawyer, figure skater, ice hockey player and a football defender, manager and referee.

Life and career
Elemer Hirsch came from a wealthy Jewish family who owned large portions of land in Beclean. He studied law school in Budapest and Vienna, starting to work as a lawyer at age 24. He started playing football at CA Cluj. Several years later he moved to Universitatea Cluj, where he also played ice hockey. Hirsch also competed in figure skating competitions, managing to win three Romanian national titles in 1924, 1925 and 1927, also becoming an international figure skating judge. After he retired from playing football, he became a football referee, including arbitrating in a Romanian top-division Divizia A match. In the 1940s following the Second Vienna Award, due to his Jewish origin, the Hungarian authorities prohibited him from working as a lawyer and deprived him of his property which was later nationalized by the Romanian communist regime. He managed to escape from Cluj when the authorities wanted to send him to a Holocaust extermination camp. After the end of World War II he returned to Cluj and started his coaching career at CFR. Between 1947 and 1948 he was the federal captain of Romania's national team. In 1950 he became coach at Armata Cluj. In May 1953 after the end of a match in Baia Mare he collapsed on his way to the team bus, the goalkeeper Nicolae Szoboszlay tried to give him first aid but Hirsch died in his arms.

International career
Elemer Hirsch played in the first official match of Romania's national team at the 1922 King Alexander's Cup, against Yugoslavia. Hirsch bought Romania's equipment for that match from his own money. He was also part of Romania's 1924 Summer Olympics squad.

Scores and results table. Romania's goal tally first:

See also
List of Jews in sports (non-players)

References

External links

1895 births
1953 deaths
People from Cluj County
Romanian footballers
Romania international footballers
Olympic footballers of Romania
Footballers at the 1924 Summer Olympics
Association football defenders
Liga I players
FC Universitatea Cluj players
Romanian football managers
CFR Cluj managers
Romanian football referees
Romanian ice hockey players
Romanian male single skaters
20th-century Romanian lawyers
Jewish footballers
People from the Kingdom of Hungary
Jewish Romanian sportspeople